Galgupha nitiduloides is a species of ebony bug in the family Thyreocoridae. It is found in Central America and North America.

Subspecies
These three subspecies belong to the species Galgupha nitiduloides:
 Galgupha nitiduloides coerulescens (Stål, 1862)
 Galgupha nitiduloides nitiduloides (Wolff, 1902)
 Galgupha nitiduloides texensis McAtee & Malloch, 1933

References

Shield bugs
Articles created by Qbugbot
Insects described in 1802